Ipsos MORI was the name of a market research company based in London, England which is now known as Ipsos and still continues as the UK arm of the global Ipsos group. It was formed by a merger of Ipsos UK and MORI in October 2005.

The company is a member of the British Polling Council and Market Research Society.

History
In 1946, Mark Abrams formed a market research company called Research Services Ltd. (RSL). RSL operated until 1991 when it was acquired by Ipsos, becoming Ipsos UK. 

MORI (Market and Opinion Research International) was founded in 1969 by Robert Worcester. Robert Worcester stepped down from chairmanship of MORI in June 2005. Ipsos announced it would acquire MORI in October 2005 for £88 million, and would merge it with Ipsos UK. The merged company was named Ipsos MORI. In February 2022 the company rebranded to simply .

Methodology
Ipsos MORI's research is conducted via a wide range of methodologies, using computer-assisted telephone interviewing (CATI), as well as face-to-face (CAPI) and Internet surveys. Many telephone surveys use a system called random digit dialing to interview a representative group of the population.

Controversies
In May 2013, The Sunday Times reported that Ipsos MORI had negotiated an agreement with the EE mobile phone network to commercialise the data on that company's 23 million subscribers.  The article stated that Ipsos MORI was looking to sell this data to the Metropolitan Police and other parties. The data included "gender, age, postcode, websites visited, time of day text is sent [and] location of customer when call is made". When confronted by the newspaper, the Metropolitan Police indicated that they would not be taking the discussions any further. Ipsos MORI defended their actions, stressing that the company only received anonymised data, without any personally identifiable data on an individual customer, and underlining that reports are only ever made on aggregated groups of more than 50 customers.

References

External links
 
 Recent Research 
 Ipsos Global Website 

Public opinion research companies
Market research companies of the United Kingdom
Companies based in the London Borough of Tower Hamlets
Polling organisations in the United Kingdom